"Somebody's Needin' Somebody" is a song written by Len Chera, and recorded by American country music artist Conway Twitty.  It was released in March 1984 as the first single from the album By Heart.  The song was Twitty's 31st number one country single.  The single went to number one for one week and spent a total of 14 weeks on the country chart.

Charts

Weekly charts

Year-end charts

References
 

Conway Twitty songs
1984 singles
Warner Records singles
1984 songs